"Crazy Chick" is a song by Welsh recording artist Charlotte Church, released as the lead single from her fifth studio album, Tissues and Issues (2005). It was written by Sarah Buras, Wirlie "Wyl-e" Morris, and Fitzgerald Scott and produced by Tore Johannson. Originally intended for Fame Academy series two alumnus Alex Parks, the song was offered to Church when Parks rejected it. Church loathed the song, calling it "throwaway pop", but she succumbed to her record company's demands and recorded it. The lyrics of the song describes a woman who feels that she needs professional help because she is madly in love.

"Crazy Chick" was released in the United Kingdom on 27 June 2005. The song reached number two on the UK Singles Chart in July 2005, becoming Church's second top-three hit on that chart and her first under her real name (she was credited as "CMC" on "The Opera Song (Brave New World)"). The single also reached number 10 in Ireland and the top 40 in Australia and New Zealand. In February 2021, the British Phonographic Industry (BPI) awarded the song a silver sales certification for sales and streams exceeding 200,000.

Background
"Crazy Chick" was written by Sarah Buras, Wirlie "Wyl-e" Morris, and Fitzgerald Scott. They originally offered the song to Alex Parks, a contestant in the second series of British talent competition Fame Academy, but she turned the offer down. Instead, they approached Charlotte Church, who had recently switched from singing classical music to pop music. In 2012, Church revealed that she hated the song, as she saw the lyrics as "stupid", but she was forced to record it. It was then added onto Tissues and Issues because she was unable to write any songs herself. Church explained that this originated from her belief that early songwriting is substandard, so she relented to her record company and allowed them to include more single-worthy tracks on the album. The song's resulting popularity enraged her more, with her explaining, "I hated it because it didn't mean anything – I don't think it helped anyone with their emotional problems – and it was just a bit of throwaway pop, which I wasn't about".

Critical reception
Justin Myers of the Official Charts Company wrote that "Crazy Chick" was a "breath of fresh air [...] reminiscent of a '60s girlgroup" and complimented Church's vocals, noting that they resembled those of Christina Aguilera's at several instances. British columnist James Masterton said that, compared to Church's earlier classical work, "Crazy Chick" was underwhelming, calling her voice "too good" for the track and noting that Joss Stone would have performed the song better.

Track listings

Credits and personnel
Credits are lifted from the UK CD2 liner notes.

Studios
 Recorded at Gula Studio (Malmö, Sweden)
 Mixed at the Pierce Rooms (London, UK)

Personnel

 Fitzgerald Scott – writing
 Sarah Buras – writing
 Wirlie "Wyl-e" Morris – writing
 Charlotte Church – vocals
 Jens Lindgard – guitar, trombone
 Tore Johannson – bass, production
 Rasmus Kihlberg – drums

 Martin Gjerstad – keyboard
 Petter Lindgard – trumpet
 Sven Andersson – saxophone
 David Carlsson – engineering
 Steve Fitzmaurice – mixing
 Mark Reilly – mixing assistant

Charts

Weekly charts

Year-end charts

Certifications

Release history

References

2005 singles
2005 songs
Charlotte Church songs
Music videos directed by Vaughan Arnell
Songs written by Serabee
Sony BMG singles